"Touch Your Woman" is a song written and originally recorded by American singer-songwriter Dolly Parton. It was released on February 14, 1972 as the only single from the album of the same name. It provided a 1972 top-ten country single for her.  A tranquil, slow-tempo ballad, the song differed from many of Parton's other hits at the time, in that it was neither an upbeat, lilting country number, nor a nostalgic reminiscence of her rural childhood. "Touch Your Woman" reached number 6 on the U.S. country singles charts in March 1972, though a number of country radio stations refused to play it because they found it too sexually suggestive.

It has since been included in a number of Parton's compilation albums, including Best of Dolly Parton, The RCA Years, and The Essential Dolly Parton.

Content
The lyrics speak of a disagreement between lovers, but concludes with the line "all you have to do to make it right is just touch your woman".

Cover versions
The song was covered in late 1972 by R&B artist Margie Joseph, and in 2002 by folk singer Kate Campbell.

Chart performance

References

External links

Touch Your Woman lyrics at Dolly Parton On-Line

1972 singles
1971 songs
Dolly Parton songs
Songs written by Dolly Parton
RCA Records singles
Song recordings produced by Bob Ferguson (musician)